Samuel Penny (1808-1853) was an American Episcopal clergyman. Born to Presbyterian parents in New York, he attended Lane Theological Seminary before joining the Episcopal Church in the United States of America. A graduate of Columbia University and the General Theological Seminary of the Episcopal Church, Penny was ordained to the diaconate and priesthood in 1838. He served most of his ordained ministry in charge of Emmanuel Church, Manville, Rhode Island, leaving briefly to accompany Bishop Horatio Southgate on a missionary journey to the Ottoman Empire.

External links
An Address delivered in St. Stephen's Church, Providence, R.I., on Wednesday, September 21, 1853, at Services Held in Commemoration of the Late Rev. Samuel Penny, Rector of Emanuel Church, Manville, Rhode Island by Henry Waterman (1853)
The Silent Preacher: Being Posthumous Sermons of the Rev. Samuel Penny 1854

American Episcopal priests
Lane Theological Seminary alumni
Columbia University alumni
General Theological Seminary alumni
1808 births
1853 deaths
19th-century American Episcopalians
19th-century American clergy